Cohors prima Flavia Canathenorum [sagittaria] [milliaria] ("1st Flavian cohort of Canathaens, archers, 1000 strong") was a Roman auxiliary cohort of infantry.

Name 
 Flavia: Flavian. The Imperial family name shows a link to the emperors Vespasian, Titus or Domitian. The unit was probably raised during the reign of Vespasian.
 Canathenorum: Canathans. At the time the unit was raised, the recruits came from the city of Canatha and the nearby area.
 sagittariorum or sagittaria: Archers.
 milliaria: 1000 strong. A Cohors milliaria peditata had a nominal strength of 800, a Cohors milliaria equitata of 1040. On the military diplomas the sign  is used instead of milliaria.

Since there is no indication for equitata, the unit was a Cohors milliaria peditata (infantry unit)  with a nominal strength of 800 men.

Military diplomas 
The unit is attested on military diplomas for the province of Raetia issued in 116, 116/121, 125/128, 139, 151/170, 154/161, 156, 157, 157/161, 159/160, 160, 162, 166 and 167/168.

Garrisons 
Possible garrisons in Raetia were:

 Eining
 Kösching
 Regensburg-Kumpfmühl
 Sorviodurum (Straubing): The unit was stationed here in the 2nd and 3rd century.

Tiles with the stamp C I F C were found in Eining and Kösching, tiles with the stamp COH I CAN in Regensburg-Kumpfmühl and Sorviodurum.

Attested personnel 
The following personnel is attested on diplomas or inscriptions:

Commanders
 Aelius [.] (ca. 162): he is listed on the military diploma
 M. Plotius Faustus

Soldiers
 Asuodane, a soldier: the diploma was issued for him.

See also 
 Roman auxiliaries
 List of Roman auxiliary regiments

References
 Farkas István Gergő: THE ROMAN ARMY IN RAETIA Dissertation, University of Pécs Faculty of Humanities 2015, P. 151-152, 243-259, 409-412 (PDF 19,1 MB, P.154-155, 246-262, 412-415)
 John Spaul: Cohors² The evidence for and a short history of the auxiliary infantry units of the Imperial Roman Army, British Archaeological Reports 2000, BAR International Series (Book 841),

Citations

External links

Military of ancient Rome
Auxiliary infantry units of ancient Rome